The Hope That Kills You is a studio album by the band Palm Springs. It is the band's second long-playing record, featuring earlier singles "I Start Fires" (2007), "Blood and Water" (2008) and "Free Atlas" (2009).

Track listing
"I Start Fires" (4:04)
"No More Shall We Be" (3:27)
"Still Life" (3:28)
"The Constellation" (3:45)
"Free Atlas" (3:36)
"Taint And Trespass" (3:09)
"Candy Milk" (4:12)
"Blood And Water" (3:55)
"The Harm Still Hidden" (3:40)
"There Is Nothing Left To Love" (4:16)
"Bury Me Not" (5:56)

Personnel
All tracks on the album were written and performed by Cane and Russo with the following additional personnel:

 Grant Allardyce – drums on tracks 1, 3, 4, 5, 8, 11; percussion on track 2
 Jane Bartholomew – backing vocals on tracks 2, 9 and 10
 Ellie Blackshaw – violin on tracks 4 and 9
 Neil Cantwell – keyboards on track 11; electric guitar and percussion on track 7; piano on tracks 3–5, 7, 10 and 11
 Sophie Greenhalgh – violin on tracks 2, 4 and 9
 Ros Hanson – viola on tracks 2, 4 and 9
 Gareth Herrick – backing vocals on track 3
 Mark Jesson – cello on tracks 1, 2, 4–11; string arrangements for tracks 2, 4 and 9
 Kah – backing vocals on tracks 1, 4, 6 and 11
 Johny Lamb – cornet and backing vocals on track 3
 Pete Lush – backing vocals on track 3
 Jeffers Mayo – extra electric guitar on track 1
 Sally Megee – backing vocals on tracks 3, 5 and 11
 Paul Pascoe – backing vocals on tracks 1–3, 5, 7, 8, 10 and 11; electric bass on tracks 1, 3, 5, 8, 10 and 11; electric guitar on tracks 4 and 5; harmonium on track 7; Moog synthesizer on track 4
 Matt Sigley – piano and backing vocals on track 8
 DC Cane – cover photography

External links
 Random Acts Of Vinyl official website

2010 albums
Palm Springs (band) albums